Joseph Bryan Nelson MBE FRSE (14 March 1932 – 29 June 2015) was a British ornithologist, environmental activist and academic. He was a prominent authority on seabirds, publishing numerous books and articles on gannets, cormorants and other species, teaching zoology at the University of Aberdeen, and conducting pioneering ornithological research in Jordan, Christmas Island and the Galápagos Islands. In his lifetime, Nelson was "acclaimed as the world's leading expert on the northern gannet".  He also contributed to the creation of Christmas Island National Park, which helped to preserve the habitat of the endangered Abbott's booby.

Early life and education
Nelson was born in Shipley, West Yorkshire in 1932, the third of four children of a motor engineer and a draper. For most of his life, he was known by his middle name, Bryan. As a child during World War II, he developed a fascination with birds after he was given a book on ornithology. He attended a grammar school in the town of Saltaire, but left school at 16 and worked for some years in a sewage treatment plant to help support his family. After completing his studies at a night school, Nelson attended St Andrews University to study zoology, graduating in 1959. Thereafter, he began a DPhil in ecology at Oxford University, entitled The breeding biology of the gannet (Sula bassana) with particular reference to behaviour, under the supervision of the Nobel Prize-winning Dutch biologist Nikolaas Tinbergen. In 1960, Nelson married his research colleague June Davison, who accompanied him to Bass Rock in the Firth of Forth to study gannets. The couple spent their honeymoon on Bass Rock, and subsequently lived there in a garden shed from 1960–63. Without insulation and held down against the wind by hawsers, the shed was erected with the aid of local lighthouse keepers, and "sat eerily within the ruins of the sixth-century St Baldred's chapel." They endured harsh coastal weather and regularly climbed down steep cliffs without safety equipment to study birds' nests.

Ornithological research
After completing his DPhil in 1963, Nelson travelled with his wife to several uninhabited islands in the Galápagos Islands to continue his research on seabirds, primarily studying blue-footed, masked and red-footed boobies. The couple lived in a tent and went naked for an entire year while studying the booby and frigate-bird populations of the islands. At one point, Prince Philip, Duke of Edinburgh visited the islands, and invited the Nelsons to lunch aboard the Royal Yacht Britannia; Nelson recalled attending the lunch "in patched shorts liberally splattered with albatross vomit". Prince Philip, also a seabird enthusiast, took some of Nelson's research diaries back to England with him to keep them safe from Ecuadorian customs officials, and later returned them to Nelson at Buckingham Palace.

In 1967, Nelson spent a year on Christmas Island, studying the rare Abbott's booby, whose only habitat was threatened by phosphate mining on the island. In later years, Nelson gave evidence to the Australian government about the ecological impacts of mining on Christmas Island, which ultimately contributed to the creation of Christmas Island National Park to protect the island's biodiversity. In 1968, Nelson and his wife travelled to Jordan, where he served as the director of the Azraq Desert Research Station and studied the migratory birds of the region. He also performed an in-depth study of a colony of Australasian gannets at Cape Kidnappers, New Zealand.

Nelson conducted pioneering fieldwork on the habits and communication methods of gannets and boobies; among his key hypotheses was the suggestion that gannets use a gesture known as "skypointing" to warn mates that they are about to leave the nest. As Scottish Field Magazine noted: "He interpreted and described the fascinating non-verbal communication of gannets. As a zoology lecturer, he amused and inspired thousands of Aberdeen University students over many years with his 'skypointing' and 'beak fencing'." He was the author of an authoritative 1,000-page monograph on boobies and gannets, including a volume on Pelecaniformes and a more general volume on seabird biology and ecology.

Academic career
In 1969, Nelson became a lecturer in zoology at Aberdeen University, and taught there until his retirement in 1985. He published a number of highly regarded ornithological monographs and textbooks, appeared on numerous television and radio programmes, made several nature documentaries and helped pioneer high-speed photography techniques for imaging birds in flight. He furthermore wrote a number of books for general audiences, including a 2013 memoir of his time on the Galápagos Islands. He became a Fellow of the Royal Society of Edinburgh in 1982 and was appointed MBE in 2006.

He was also a key founder and important supporter of the Scottish Seabird Centre, of which he was a charity trustee from 1997 to 2012. In 2013 he was appointed as the centre's Special Ornithological Advisor.  The centre flew its flag at half mast upon his death.

Personal life
Nelson married June Davison in 1960; she survived him, as did their twin children, Simon and Becky, and two grandchildren. Nelson spent most of his later years in Scotland, latterly in the town of Kirkcudbright, and enjoyed boating, hill walking and birdwatching in his spare time.

Nelson died of a genetic heart defect at his home in Kirkcudbright in June 2015.  Nelson's "green burial" was conducted at Roucan Loch outside Dumfries. He outlived all three of his siblings.

Selected published works
 Azraq: Desert Oasis. Athens: Ohio University Press, 1974. Penguin Books, 1973, 

 The Gannet. City: Shire Publications, 1999, 

 The Atlantic Gannet. Great Yarmouth: Fenix Books Ltd, Norfolk, 2002, 
 Pelicans, cormorants and their relatives: Pelecanidae, Sulidae, Phalacrocoracidae, Anhingidae, Fregatidae, Phaethontidae (also: Pelicans, Cormorants and their Allies). Oxford: Oxford University Press, 2005,

References

Notes

Citations

External links

1932 births
2015 deaths
English ornithologists
British textbook writers
Alumni of the University of St Andrews
Alumni of the University of Oxford
Academics of the University of Aberdeen
Members of the Order of the British Empire
Fellows of the Royal Society of Edinburgh
People from Shipley, West Yorkshire
British expatriates in Ecuador